Asian and African Studies is a biannually published peer-reviewed academic journal that was established in 1965 by the Institute of Oriental Studies of the Slovak Academy of Sciences in Bratislava. covering research on Africa and Asia. It covers aspects of oriental culture, linguistics, and history, with stress being laid on methodology.

The editor-in-chief is Karol R. Sorby (Comenius University).

Abstracting and indexing 
The journal is abstracted and indexed in:
 GEOBASE
 Scopus
 MLA - Modern Language Association Database
 Worldwide Political Science Abstracts
 Historical Abstracts

References

External links
 

Asian studies journals
African studies journals
Publications established in 1965
English-language journals
Biannual journals
Creative Commons Attribution-licensed journals
Slovak Academy of Sciences